Gary Talpas is an American art director and photographer. Talpas worked as designer and art director for Nine Inch Nails on Pretty Hate Machine, "Head Like A Hole", The Downward Spiral and Further Down the Spiral. He also played keyboards for several early shows during the Pretty Hate Machine tour after Chris Vrenna switched to drums.

Talpas  would later develop artwork for Smells Like Children for Marilyn Manson.

References

Living people
Year of birth missing (living people)
Nine Inch Nails
American art directors
American photographers
Logo designers